This is a list of electrical generating stations in Yukon, Canada.

The government-owned Yukon Energy Corporation is the main power generator, while Yukon Electrical Company, a subsidiary of Alberta-based ATCO, is in charge of distribution in most areas.

Yukon Energy facilities have a total capacity of 116 MW, including four hydroelectric generating stations, a two-turbine wind farm and 19 diesel-powered generators: eight in Whitehorse, two in Mayo, six in Dawson and three in Faro. Since the commission of a high-voltage power line linking the Mayo generating station to Dawson, the diesel generators are mainly used in emergencies. The territory is not connected to the North American power grid.

Hydroelectric 
List of all hydroelectric generating stations in Yukon.

Wind 

List of all wind farms in Yukon.

References

See also 
 Energy in Canada
 List of electrical generating stations in Canada

Lists of power stations in Canada